Paper Thin may refer to:

"Paper Thin" (Illenium, Tom DeLonge and Angels & Airwaves song), 2020
"Paper Thin" (MC Lyte song), 1988
"Paper Thin", a song by Astrid S, 2015
 “Paper Thin”, a play by T.K. Lee, 2018